The Stadio Olimpico di San Marino (or Stadio Olimpico di Serravalle) is a multi-purpose stadium in Serravalle, San Marino. First opened in 1969, it is currently used mostly for football matches. It is the national stadium of San Marino.

Overview
The Stadio Olimpico was also used by Serravalle-based football club A.C. Juvenes/Dogana for its home games in the Italian league, until the side withdrew to concentrate only on the Sammarinese Championship. The Stadio Olimpico is an all-seater stadium and has a maximum capacity of 6,664. It has hosted teams such as England, Spain, Germany, the Netherlands and Scotland.

The San Marino national team's three biggest defeats at the stadium are a record 13–0 to Germany in September 2006, 10–0 to England in 2021, and joint third are two 8–0 defeats in 2013 to both England and Ukraine. The national team's only win was also in this stadium; a friendly 1–0 beating of Liechtenstein in 2004.

San Marino's first official international match, which was a 4–0 defeat to Switzerland, was also played here.

It is also home to the youth teams of San Marino, some of which have worse records on the international stage than the senior team; though their Under-21 side did record a shock 1–0 win over their Welsh counterparts in 2013.

In 2014, at the stadium, the San Marino national team earned its first ever point in European Championship qualifying, in a 0–0 draw with Estonia.

It hosted matches at the 2019 UEFA European Under-21 Championship

The final of the San Marino domestic cup, the Coppa Titano, is also played here each year.

See also
Sport in San Marino
Football in San Marino

References

External links

World Stadium Article

Football venues in San Marino
Athletics (track and field) venues in San Marino
San Marino
A.S.D. Victor San Marino
Multi-purpose stadiums in San Marino
Serravalle (San Marino)